The Vancouver Community Library is a library in Vancouver, Washington, in the United States. Part of the Fort Vancouver Regional Library District, the 83,000-square-foot library is the second largest in the Portland metropolitan area, second to the Central Library in Portland, Oregon. The library's grand opening was held on July 17, 2011. It is a LEED Gold Certified building.

References

External links
 

2011 establishments in Washington (state)
Buildings and structures in Vancouver, Washington
Libraries in Washington (state)
Library buildings completed in 2011